The deep-water hap (Placidochromis electra) is a species of cichlid endemic to Lake Malawi where it prefers areas with sandy substrates, generally at depths of around .  This species can reach a length of  SL.  This species can also be found in the aquarium trade.

References

External links 
 Photograph

Deep-water hap
Taxa named by Warren E. Burgess
Fish described in 1979
Taxonomy articles created by Polbot